John Trebilcock (born August 17, 1973) is an American politician who served in the Oklahoma House of Representatives from the 98th district from 2002 to 2014.

References

1973 births
Living people
Republican Party members of the Oklahoma House of Representatives